Arkady Borisovich Borisov (Russian, Аркадий Борисович Борисов, May 13, 1901 – May 27, 1942) was a Soviet corps commander. He was born in what is now Uzbekistan. He fought for the Bolsheviks against the White movement during the civil war. He was a recipient of the Order of the Red Banner. During the Great Purge, he was arrested on February 10, 1938 and imprisoned in Rostov. While he was imprisoned, his predecessor Ivan Kosogov and successor Yakov Sheko were executed. He was later released and died on May 27, 1942.

References
 

Soviet major generals
Soviet military personnel of the Russian Civil War
Soviet military personnel of World War II
Recipients of the Order of the Red Banner
Frunze Military Academy alumni
People from Bukhara 
1901 births
1942 deaths